Ribblehead Quarry is a former limestone quarry next to  railway station in the Yorkshire Dales National Park, North Yorkshire, England. It had a connection to the Settle–Carlisle line, with most of its products being sent out via the railway.

History 
The quarry was in existence by the end of the 19th century, but the Craven Lime Company who owned it, allowed quarrying operations to lapse around 1907. Despite being located near to  railway station, the quarry was not located near to a population centre, and getting workers to travel to the quarry was difficult. Originally, the stone won from the quarry was used in building the adjacent railway line, but in the early twentieth century, the stone was used in North East England for iron and steel production, along with being an additive in toothpaste and household cleaners. In 1943, the quarry was reopened to operations, producing agricultural limestone. A north connected siding was provided for the quarrying operations run by H. Austin in 1945, which later (in 1974) involved the removal of the down platform on the railway line (for trains northwards serving Carlisle). In 1973, Amey Roadstone Company (ARC) bought the quarry to replace quarrying operations at its Middlebarrow Quarry near to Silverdale (now Cumbria) which was nearing the end of its quarrying licence.

Between 1976 and 1986, the quarry produced  of railway ballast every year. This was sent out via rail over the Settle & Carlisle Line. In an effort to combat the effects of acid rain caused by pollution, limestone would have been added to power station gas-flues, absorbing the sulphur.

In 2000, the former Ribblehead Quarry site became part of the Ingleborough National Nature Reserve. The company that owned the quarry (Hanson) turned the site over to English Nature in October 2000, in the expectation that it would reach peak re-wilding status by 2040. A stone bench known as the Geology Seat has been constructed inside the quarry, which is on a path linking Ribblehead with Selside. Visitors are encouraged to sit down to listen to an audio recording describing the geology, wildlife and history of the area.

The siding for the quarry has since been re-used to forward timber out from a culling programme on Cam Fell, and also again to forward stone, this time quarried from nearby Ingleton, but transported in by road before rail transport.

Nature reserve 
The quarry bottom is host to what has been described as the "nationally scarce" birds eye primrose. Birds that have been observed at the site include oystercatcher, raven, redshank, and ringed plover.

References

External links 

The quarry located at Gridref SD767788
Wildlife report from 2016
Inglebrough SSSI map

Craven District
Quarries in North Yorkshire
Ribblesdale